Lawrence Monsanto Ferlinghetti (March 24, 1919 – February 22, 2021) was an American poet, painter, social activist, and co-founder of City Lights Booksellers & Publishers. An author of poetry, translations, fiction, theatre, art criticism, and film narration, Ferlinghetti was best known for his second collection of poems, A Coney Island of the Mind (1958), which has been translated into nine languages and sold over a million copies. When Ferlinghetti turned 100 in March 2019, the city of San Francisco turned his birthday, March 24, into "Lawrence Ferlinghetti Day".

Early life
Ferlinghetti was born on March 24, 1919, in Yonkers, New York. 
Shortly before his birth, his father, Carlo, a native of Brescia, died of a heart attack; and his mother, Clemence Albertine (née Mendes-Monsanto), of Portuguese Sephardic Jewish descent, was committed to a mental hospital shortly after. He was raised by an aunt, and later by foster parents. He attended the Mount Hermon School for Boys (later Northfield Mount Hermon) graduating in 1937, then the University of North Carolina at Chapel Hill, where he earned a B.A. in journalism in 1941. He began his journalism career by writing sports for The Daily Tar Heel, and published his first short stories in Carolina Magazine, for which Thomas Wolfe had written.

He served in the U.S. Navy throughout World War II, as the captain of a submarine chaser in the Normandy invasion. In 1947, he earned an M.A. degree in English literature from Columbia University with a thesis on John Ruskin and the British painter J. M. W. Turner. From Columbia, he went to the University of Paris and earned a Ph.D. in comparative literature with a dissertation on Paris as a symbol in modern poetry.

Ferlinghetti met his wife-to-be, Selden Kirby-Smith, the granddaughter of Edmund Kirby-Smith, in 1946 aboard a ship en route to France. They were both heading to Paris to study at the Sorbonne. Kirby-Smith went by the name Kirby.

He moved to San Francisco in 1951 and founded City Lights in North Beach in 1953, in partnership with Peter D. Martin, a student at San Francisco State University. They both invested $500. In 1955 Ferlinghetti bought Martin's share and established a publishing house with the same name. The first series he published was the Pocket Poets Series. He was arrested for publishing Allen Ginsberg's Howl, resulting in a First Amendment trial in 1957, where Ferlinghetti was charged with publishing an obscene work—and acquitted.

Poetry

Ferlinghetti published many of the Beat poets and is considered by some as a Beat poet as well. Yet Ferlinghetti did not consider himself to be a Beat poet, as he said in the 2013 documentary Ferlinghetti: Rebirth of Wonder: "Don't call me a Beat. I never was a Beat poet."

Ferlinghetti penned much of his early poetry in the vein of T. S. Eliot. Ferlinghetti told poet and critic Jack Foley, "Everything I wrote sounded just like him." Yet, even in his poems inspired by Eliot such as Ferlinghetti's "Constantly Risking Absurdity," Ferlinghetti is ever the populist as he compares the poet first to a trapeze artist in a circus and then to a "little charleychaplin man."

Critics have noted that Ferlinghetti's poetry often takes on a highly visual dimension as befits this poet who was also a painter. As the poet and critic Jack Foley states, Ferlinghetti's poems "tell little stories, make 'pictures'." Ferlinghetti as a poet paints with his words pictures full of color capturing the average American experience as seen in his poem "In Golden Gate Park that Day: "In Golden Gate Park that day/ a man and his wife were coming along/ ... He was wearing green suspenders ... while his wife was carrying a bunch of grapes." In the first poem in A Coney Island of the Mind entitled, "In Goya's Greatest Scenes, We Seem To See," Ferlinghetti describes with words the "suffering humanity" that Goya portrayed by brush in his paintings. Ferlinghetti concludes his poem with the recognition that "suffering humanity" today might be painted as average Americans drowning in the materialism: "on a freeway fifty lanes wide/ a concrete continent/ spaced with bland billboards/ illustrating imbecile illusions of happiness."

Ferlinghetti took a distinctly populist approach to poetry, emphasizing throughout his work "that art should be accessible to all people, not just a handful of highly educated intellectuals." Larry Smith, an American author and editor, stated that Ferlinghetti is a poet, "of the people engaged conscientiously in the creation of new poetic and cultural forms." This perception of art as a broad socio-cultural force, as opposed to an elitist academic enterprise, is explicitly evident in Poem 9 from Pictures of the Gone World, wherein the speaker states: Truth is not the secret of a few' / yet / you would maybe think so / the way some / librarians / and cultural ambassadors and / especially museum directors / act" (1–8). In addition to Ferlinghetti's aesthetic egalitarianism, this passage highlights two additional formal features of the poet's work, namely, his incorporation of a common American idiom as well as his experimental approach to line arrangement which, as Crale Hopkins notes, is inherited from the poetry of William Carlos Williams.

Reflecting his broad aesthetic concerns, Ferlinghetti's poetry often engages with several non-literary artistic forms, most notably jazz music and painting. William Lawlor asserts that much of Ferlinghetti's free verse attempts to capture the spontaneity and imaginative creativity of modern jazz; the poet is noted for having frequently incorporated jazz accompaniments into public readings of his work.

Political engagement
Soon after settling in San Francisco in 1951, Ferlinghetti met the poet Kenneth Rexroth, whose concepts of philosophical anarchism influenced his political development. He self-identified as a philosophical anarchist, regularly associated with other anarchists in North Beach, and sold Italian anarchist newspapers at the City Lights Bookstore. While Ferlinghetti said he was "an anarchist at heart", he conceded that the world would need to be populated by "saints" in order for pure anarchism to be lived practically. Hence he espoused what can be achieved by Scandinavian-style democratic socialism.

On January 14, 1967, he was a featured presenter at the Gathering of the tribes "Human Be-In," which drew tens of thousands of people and launched San Francisco's "Summer of Love." In 1968, he signed the "Writers and Editors War Tax Protest" pledge, vowing to refuse tax payments in protest against the Vietnam War.

In 1998, in his inaugural address as Poet Laureate of San Francisco, Ferlinghetti urged San Franciscans to vote to remove a portion of the earthquake-damaged Central Freeway and replace it with a boulevard. "What destroys the poetry of a city? Automobiles destroy it, and they destroy more than the poetry. All over America, all over Europe in fact, cities and towns are under assault by the automobile, are being literally destroyed by car culture. But cities are gradually learning that they don't have to let it happen to them. Witness our beautiful new Embarcadero! And in San Francisco right now we have another chance to stop Autogeddon from happening here. Just a few blocks from here, the ugly Central Freeway can be brought down for good if you vote for Proposition E on the November ballot."

Painting
Alongside his bookselling and publishing, Ferlinghetti painted for 60 years and much of his work was displayed in galleries and museums throughout the United States.

Ferlinghetti painted The beautiful Madonna of Sandusky Oh! hi! O! And friend during a 1996 visit to an art co-op in Sandusky, Ohio, which was subsequently vandalized and censored by a janitor the night after it was painted. Ferlinghetti responded to this act by painting a humorous retort on areas of the canvas where censorship had occurred.

In 2009, Ferlinghetti became a member of the Honour Committee of the Italian artistic literary movement IMMAGINE&POESIA, founded under the patronage of Aeronwy Thomas. A retrospective of Ferlinghetti's artwork, 60 Years of Painting, was staged in Rome and Reggio Calabria in 2010.

Jack Kerouac Alley
In 1987, he was the initiator of the transformation of Jack Kerouac Alley, located at the side of his shop. He presented his idea to the San Francisco Board of Supervisors calling for repavement and renewal.

Death
Ferlinghetti died of interstitial lung disease on February 22, 2021, at his home in San Francisco at age 101.

Awards

Ferlinghetti received numerous awards, including the Los Angeles Times''' Robert Kirsch Award, the BABRA Award for Lifetime Achievement,  the National Book Critics Circle Ivan Sandrof Award for Contribution to American Arts and Letters, and the ACLU Earl Warren Civil Liberties Award. He won the Premio Taormina in 1973, and thereafter was awarded the Premio Camaiore, the Premio Flaiano, the Premio Cavour, among other honors in Italy. The Career Award was conferred on October 28, 2017 at the XIV edition of the Premio di Arti Letterarie Metropoli di Torino in Turin.

Ferlinghetti was named San Francisco's Poet Laureate in August 1998 and served for two years. In 2003 he was awarded the Poetry Society of America's Frost Medal, the Author's Guild Lifetime Achievement Award, and was elected to the American Academy of Arts and Letters. The National Book Foundation honored him with the inaugural Literarian Award (2005), given for outstanding service to the American literary community. In 2007 he was named Commandeur, French Order of Arts and Letters. In 2008, Ferlinghetti was awarded the John Ciardi Award for Lifetime Achievement in Poetry. This award is handed out by the National Italian American Foundation to honor the author who has made the greatest contribution to the writing of Italian American poetry.

In 2012, Ferlinghetti was awarded the inaugural Janus Pannonius International Poetry Prize from the Hungarian PEN Club. After learning that the government of Hungary under Prime Minister Viktor Orbán is a partial sponsor of the  prize, he declined to accept the award. In declining, Ferlinghetti cited his opposition to the "right-wing regime" of Prime Minister Orbán, and his opinion that the ruling Hungarian government under Mr. Orbán is curtailing civil liberties and freedom of speech for the people of Hungary.

In popular culture

Ferlinghetti recited the poem Loud Prayer at The Band's final performance; the concert was filmed by Martin Scorsese and released as a documentary entitled The Last Waltz, which included Ferlinghetti's recitation. Ferlinghetti was the subject of the 2013 Christopher Felver documentary Lawrence Ferlinghetti: A Rebirth of Wonder. Andrew Rogers played Ferlinghetti in the 2010 film Howl. Christopher Felver made the 2013 documentary on Ferlinghetti Lawrence Ferlinghetti: A Rebirth of Wonder.

In 2011, Ferlinghetti contributed two of his poems to the celebration of the 150th anniversary of Italian unification, Song of the Third World War and Old Italians Dying inspired by the artists of the exhibition Lawrence Ferlinghetti and Italy 150 held in Turin, Italy (May–June 2011). On the book of lithographs The Sea Within Us first published in Italy as Il Mare Dentro in 2012, Ferlinghetti collaborated with lithographer and abstract artist James Claussen. Julio Cortázar, in his Rayuela (Hopscotch) (1963), references a poem from A Coney Island of the Mind in Chapter 121.

BibliographyTentative Description of a Dinner Given to Promote the Impeachment of President Eisenhower (Golden Mountain Press, 1958) Broadside poemHer (New Directions, 1960) ProseOne Thousand Fearful Words for Fidel Castro (City Lights, 1961) Broadside poemStarting from San Francisco (New Directions, 1961) Poetry (HC edition includes LP of author reading selections)Journal for the Protection of All Beings (City Lights, 1961) JournalUnfair Arguments with Existence (New Directions, 1963) Short PlaysWhere is VietNam? (Golden Mountain Press, 1963) Broadside poemRoutines (New Directions, 1964) 12 Short PlaysTwo Scavengers in a Truck, Two Beautiful People in a Mercedes (1968)On the Barracks: Journal for the Protection of All Beings 2 (City Lights, 1968) JournalTyrannus Nix? (New Directions, 1969) PoetryThe Secret Meaning of Things (New Directions, 1970) PoetryThe Mexican Night (New Directions, 1970) Travel journalBack Roads to Far Towns After Basho (City Lights, 1970) PoetryLove Is No Stone on the Moon (ARIF, 1971) PoetryOpen Eye, Open Heart (New Directions, 1973) PoetryWho Are We Now? (New Directions, 1976) PoetryNorthwest Ecolog (City Lights, 1978) PoetryLandscapes of Living and Dying (1980) Endless Life, Selected Poems (A New Directions Paperbook, 1981) Over All the Obscene Boundaries (1986)Love in the Days of Rage (E. P. Dutton, 1988; City Lights, 2001) NovelA Buddha in the Woodpile (Atelier Puccini, 1993)These Are My Rivers: New & Selected Poems, 1955–1993 (New Directions, 1993) City Lights Pocket Poets Anthology (City Lights, 1995) A Far Rockaway Of The Heart (New Directions, 1998) How to Paint Sunlight: Lyrics Poems & Others, 1997–2000 (New Directions, 2001) San Francisco Poems (City Lights Foundation, 2001) Poetry Life Studies, Life Stories (City Lights, 2003) Americus: Part I (New Directions, 2004)A Coney Island of the Mind (Arion Press, 2005), with portraiture by R.B. KitajPoetry as Insurgent Art (New Directions, 2007) PoetryA Coney Island of the Mind: Special 50th Anniversary Edition with a CD of the author reading his work (New Directions, 2008)50 Poems by Lawrence Ferlinghetti 50 Images by Armando Milani (Rudiano, 2010) Poetry and Graphics Time of Useful Consciousness, (Americus, Book II) (New Directions, 2012) , 88p.City Lights Pocket Poets Anthology: 60th Anniversary Edition (City Lights, 2015)I Greet You At The Beginning Of A Great Career: The Selected Correspondence of Lawrence Ferlinghetti and Allen Ginsberg 1955–1997. (City Lights, 2015)Pictures of the Gone World: 60th Anniversary Edition (City Lights, 2015)Writing Across the Landscape: Travel Journals, 1960-2010'' (Norton, 2015) 
 Novel

Discography

References

Further reading

External links

Archivio Conz

 at The Bancroft Library
 at The Bancroft Library

Archived at Ghostarchive and the Wayback Machine: 
 reference site of early first edition Penguin Books. Translated Penguin Book
Finding aid to Lawrence Ferlinghetti papers at Columbia University. Rare Book & Manuscript Library.
"How a San Francisco bookstore owner made America freer, braver and more interesting," The Washington Post, Feb. 25, 2021.

1919 births
2021 deaths
20th-century American male writers
20th-century American poets
21st-century American male writers
21st-century American poets
American anarchists
American anti-war activists
American booksellers
American centenarians
American democratic socialists
American male poets
American people of French-Jewish descent
American people of Portuguese-Jewish descent
American tax resisters
American writers of Italian descent
Artists from San Francisco
Beat Generation writers
California socialists
City Lights Books
Columbia Graduate School of Arts and Sciences alumni
Commandeurs of the Ordre des Arts et des Lettres
Deaths from lung disease
Jewish American writers
Jewish anarchists
Members of the American Academy of Arts and Letters
Men centenarians
Military personnel from New York (state)
National Book Award winners
Northfield Mount Hermon School alumni
People from Yonkers, New York
Poets Laureate of San Francisco
San Francisco Bay Area literature
UNC Hussman School of Journalism and Media alumni
United States Navy officers
United States Navy personnel of World War II
University of Paris alumni
Writers from New York (state)
Writers from San Francisco
American expatriates in France